Paphiopedilum bellatulum, commonly known as the egg-in-a-nest orchid, is a species of orchid found from southeastern Yunnan, Guizhou and southern Guangxi of China to Indochina. It is also found in Myanmar and Thailand at an altitude of 1,000 to 1,800 meters. The leaves are a dark green with white spots on top, but the underside is purple. The flower is round, about 6–8 cm in diameter.

Gallery

References

bellatulum